Stambermill ( Stourbridge ) Viaduct is a viaduct situated in Stourbridge, West Midlands, England. It was constructed in 1850 to carry the Oxford Worcester and Wolverhampton Railway across the River Stour, and it carried passenger trains until 1964. It is still in use for goods trains, as the railway continues on to the Round Oak Steel Terminal at Brierley Hill (trains have not travelled beyond that point since 1993). Freight trains can still be seen passing over the viaduct.

A reopening of the South Staffordshire Line between Dudley and Walsall, is expected to be ready by 2023, with West Midlands Metro trams sharing the line with freight trains. A business plan for the reopening of the line was submitted to Network Rail in March 2011. In January 2012, plans surfaced to run a passenger service between Stourbridge Junction and Brierley Hill, with stations being re-opened along the route, including Brierley Hill. The service would be operated by railcars built by Parry People Movers, who built the Class 139 units which run the Stourbridge Town service.

The viaduct was subject to six weeks of maintenance and improvement works in September 2013.

References

Bridges in the West Midlands (county)
Rail transport in Dudley
Bridges completed in 1850
Stourbridge